ROH 14th Anniversary was the two-night 14th ROH Anniversary Show professional wrestling pay-per-view (PPV) event produced by the American wrestling promotion Ring of Honor (ROH). It took place on February 26 and 27, 2016 at the Sam's Town Live in the Las Vegas suburb of Sunrise Manor, Nevada. It was the fourteenth event under the ROH Anniversary name. The first night was a pay-per-view broadcast, and the second night was a set of tapings for ROH's flagship TV show Ring of Honor Wrestling.

Storylines 
ROH 14th Anniversary featured professional wrestling matches that involved wrestlers from pre-existing scripted feuds or storylines that play out on ROH's television program, Ring of Honor Wrestling. Wrestlers portrayed heroes (faces) or villains (heels) as they followed a series of events that built tension and culminated in a wrestling match or series of matches.

On January 26, 2016, ROH Matchmaker Nigel McGuinness announced that Jay Lethal would defend the ROH World Championship against Kyle O'Reilly and Adam Cole in a Triple Threat match in the Anniversary main event.

Through ROH's partnership with New Japan Pro-Wrestling (NJPW), the event also featured wrestlers from the Japanese promotion, including Hiroshi Tanahashi, Kazuchika Okada, Kushida, Tomohiro Ishii and Gedo. Shinsuke Nakamura was also originally announced for the event, but was later pulled from the show due to leaving NJPW. He was replaced by Hirooki Goto and Kenny Omega.

Originally, ROH announced that Roderick Strong would defend the ROH World Television Championship against Bobby Fish at the 14th Anniversary Show. However, on February 19 at the ROH and NJPW co-produced Honor Rising: Japan 2016 event in Tokyo, Japan, Strong lost the title to Tomohiro Ishii. Following this, Ishii was added to the scheduled Strong-Fish match, making it a Triple Threat match for the title. In addition, Hirooki Goto, who was originally scheduled to wrestle Ishii, would instead face Dalton Castle.

Results

Night 1 (PPV)

Night 2 (TV tapings)

See also
 2016 in professional wrestling

References

Professional wrestling in the Las Vegas Valley
2016 in Nevada
Events in Sunrise Manor, Nevada
14
February 2016 events in the United States
2016 Ring of Honor pay-per-view events